Low Winter Sun may refer to:
 Low Winter Sun (British TV series), 2006
 Low Winter Sun (American TV series), 2013